The escudo is a unit of currency.

Escudo may also refer to:

 Escudo hummingbird, a hummingbird in the subfamily Trochilinae
 Puerto del Escudo, a mountain pass in Castile and León, Spain
 Suzuki Escudo, a 1989–present Japanese compact SUV series
 Suzuki Grand Escudo, a 1998–2006 Japanese mid-size SUV